The Declaration of Calton Hill was a declaration calling for an independent Scottish Republic, created by the Scottish Socialist Party. It was declared on 9 October 2004, at Calton Hill in Edinburgh, at the same time that Queen Elizabeth II was officially opening the new Scottish Parliament Building at Holyrood.

This was the third time the Queen had addressed the Scottish Parliament. The first time had been at the opening of the parliament itself, on 1 July 1999, at the parliament's temporary home at the General Assembly Hall of the Church of Scotland; the second time had been during the Golden Jubilee when the Parliament was in session at the Conference Room, Kings College at the University of Aberdeen.

Calton Hill overlooks Edinburgh, and features neo-classical architecture built at the time of the Scottish Enlightenment – viewed by supporters as a symbol of hope for a possible Scottish republic. Holding the rally there at the same time as the Queen opened parliament was an attempt to highlight the aspirations of those who had demanded a Scottish Parliament, and saw the current one as only a stepping stone to full independence.

The Declaration takes the form of a petition to the government of the United Kingdom at Westminster.

The Declaration was attended by approximately 500 people, including several members of the Scottish Parliament, as well as some notable figures in literature, arts and music; the latter provided entertainment. In contrast, multiple thousands attended the procession and celebrations of the opening of the parliament building.

Origin and supporters 
Although it was created by the Scottish Socialist Party, the petition does not explicitly call for socialism in Scotland. As such it has drawn supporters from a wide range of ideologies. In particular, the declaration was supported by some from Scotland's artistic community, including Edwin Morgan, Iain Banks, Alasdair Gray, Irvine Welsh and filmmaker Peter Mullan.

Aims of the Declaration 
Primarily, the Declaration called for an independent Scotland, and characterised the nature of the potential future state, which would include liberty, equality, diversity and solidarity, as well as a non-hierarchical society. Sovereignty would rest with the People and not with a monarch or Parliament.

A written constitution was also desired, whereas currently the United Kingdom does not have a written constitution; although some oversight for laws is provided by the Human Rights Act. The Declaration stated that the hypothetical Scottish constitution would guarantee suffrage, freedom of speech and freedom of assembly; and would ensure a right of privacy and protection. It would also ensure freedom of information about government matters.

Written at a time of heightened anti-war feeling during the Iraq War, the Declaration called for "the power to refuse to send our sons and daughters to kill and die in unjust wars in foreign lands". Further, it called for "the power" to "banish nuclear weapons of mass destruction from our land". The UK's nuclear arsenal is based in Scotland.

Text of the declaration

External links

Footnotes 

2004 in Scotland
2004 in British politics
Political history of Scotland
Scottish independence
Independence movements
Republicanism in the United Kingdom
Scottish republicanism
Calton Hill
2004 documents